Bobbie J. Richardson (born December 25, 1949) is an American politician. She is the former Chair of the North Carolina Democratic Party, former First Vice Chair of the North Carolina Democratic Party and a former Democratic member of the North Carolina House of Representatives. She was appointed to represent the 7th District (which includes portions of Franklin and Nash counties) in January 2013 after then-state representative Angela Bryant was appointed to complete the unexpired term of late state senator Edward Jones. Richardson is a retired educator and administrator, with 35 years of experience as an educator in North Carolina public schools. She earned her undergraduate and master's degrees from North Carolina Central University in Durham and her doctorate from the University of North Carolina at Chapel Hill. Richardson is African-American.

On November 24, 2020, Richardson announced her candidacy to succeed Wayne Goodwin as the Chair of the North Carolina Democratic Party via social media and email. She was elected on Feb. 27, 2021, becoming the first Black person in that position.

On February 11, 2023, Richardson lost re-election as Chair of the North Carolina Democratic Party to Anderson Clayton, a 25 year old activist from Roxboro, by a margin of 272-223.

References

External links
Official page at the North Carolina General Assembly
 

|-

1949 births
21st-century American politicians
21st-century American women politicians
African-American state legislators in North Carolina
African-American women in politics
American school administrators
Educators from North Carolina
Living people
Democratic Party members of the North Carolina House of Representatives
North Carolina Democratic Party chairs
People from Franklin County, North Carolina
21st-century African-American women
21st-century African-American politicians
20th-century African-American people
20th-century African-American women